Men's Slalom World Cup 1991/1992

Calendar

Final point standings

In Men's Slalom World Cup 1991/92 all results count.

External links
FIS-ski.com - World Cup standings - Slalom 1992

World Cup
FIS Alpine Ski World Cup slalom men's discipline titles